Bobby Cochran (born 1950) is an American guitarist, singer, songwriter, and record producer. He has worked with many bands, including Steppenwolf, the Flying Burrito Brothers, Leon Russell, and Bob Weir's band Bobby and the Midnites. He was inducted into The international Rockabilly Hall of Fame along with his uncle, Eddie Cochran, at the same time, July 1, 2017.

Biography 
The international Rockabilly Hall of Fame has inducted Bobby Cochran, and Eddie Cochran, at the same time, July 1, 2017. The president thinks it's the first time it's ever happened that two family members have been inducted on the same day.

Bobby Cochran has authored Three Steps to Heaven: The Eddie Cochran Story with Susan Van Hecke.

More recently Cochran formed Somethin' Else!, a new band with Brian Hodgson and Mike Bell. They toured in Europe in 2016.

He is the nephew of musician Eddie Cochran.

Discography 
Bobby Cochran has contributed to albums by many different musical artists.  Below is a partial discography.
Slow Flux – Steppenwolf – 1974
Hour of the Wolf – Steppenwolf – 1975
Skullduggery – Steppenwolf – 1975
Bobby and the Midnites – Bobby and the Midnites – 1981
Where the Beat Meets the Street – Bobby and the Midnights – 1984
Private Edition – Bobby Cochran – 1998

Notes

External links 

Bobby Cochran Interview – NAMM Oral History Library (2009/2019)

American rock guitarists
American male guitarists
American male songwriters
Living people
Steppenwolf (band) members
1950 births
The Flying Burrito Brothers members
Bobby and the Midnites members
20th-century American guitarists